Aslıhan Malbora (born 27 March 1995) is a Turkish actress.

Life and career 
Aslıhan Malbora was born on 27 March 1995 in Afyonkarahisar. Her grandfather is of Yörük descent, which is a Turkic ethnic subgroup. She finished her primary and secondary education in her hometown. Malbora later moved to Istanbul and studied Food and Chemical Engineering at Istanbul Technical University. Within the same period she also started receiving acting lessons at different institutions, including Akademi 35.5 Art House, after which she started her acting career.

Malbora made her television debut in 2017, with a role in the TV series Seven Ne Yapmaz. She then portrayed Saliha Sultan in the historical fiction series Kalbimin Sultanı. She further rose to prominence in 2019 with her role in the romantic comedy TV series Her Yerde Sen. In 2021, she had the leading role in the Netflix original film Geçen Yaz. In the same year she began starring as Leyla in the action drama series Üç Kuruş.

Filmography

Television

Film

Web

References

External links 
 
 

1995 births
Turkish television actresses
Turkish film actresses
Istanbul Technical University alumni
People from Afyonkarahisar
Living people